Fernando Rodríguez may refer to:
Fernando Rodríguez de Castro (1125–1185), Castilian nobleman
Fernando Rodríguez de Castro (died 1304), Galician nobleman
Fernando E. Rodríguez Vargas (1888–1932), dentist, scientist and army major
Fernando Rodriguez (baseball) (born 1984), American baseball pitcher
Freddy Rodríguez (baseball) (1924–2009), former pitcher in Major League Baseball
Fernando Rodríguez (Argentine footballer) (born 1976), Argentine football forward
Fernando Rodríguez (Spanish footballer) (born 1987), Spanish footballer
Fernando Rodríguez (swimmer), Peruvian swimmer
Fernando Rodríguez (bobsleigh) (born 1931), Argentine Olympic bobsledder
Fernando Rodriguez Jr. (born 1969), United States District Judge